Steve Roden is an American sound and visual artist, who pioneered the lowercase style of music; where quiet, usually unheard, sounds are amplified to form complex and rich soundscapes. His discography includes Forms of Paper, which was commissioned by the Los Angeles public library.

In 2013 Steve Roden's work was featured in a two-person exhibition with Jenny Perlin at the Cleveland Institute of Art, Cleveland, OH and in a solo exhibition at Los Angeles Contemporary Exhibitions (LACE), Los Angeles, CA. In 2010, a mid-career survey of Roden's work was presented at the Armory Center for the Arts, Pasadena, CA, curated by Howard Fox. Solo exhibitions include the Creative Media Center, City University of Hong Kong; the Pomona College Museum of Art, Claremont, CA; the Chinati Foundation, Marfa; the Henry Art Museum, Seattle; the National Museum of Contemporary Art (EMST), Athens; the San Francisco Art Institute; the Fresno Metropolitan Museum of Art and Science; the Alyce de Roulet Williamson Gallery at Art Center College of Design, Pasadena; the Tang Museum at Skidmore College, Saratoga Springs; and the Santa Barbara Contemporary Arts Forum, Santa Barbara, among others.

His work has been included in exhibitions at the Fellows of Contemporary Art, Los Angeles, the San Francisco State University, Fine Arts Gallery, San Francisco; the Las Vegas Art Museum, Las Vegas; the Mercosur Biennial in Porto Allegre, Brazil; the Museum of Contemporary Art San Diego; the Serpentine Gallery, London; the Drawing Room, London; the Museum of Contemporary Art San Diego, La Jolla; the Sculpture Center, New York; the Centre Georges Pompidou Museum, Paris; the UCLA Hammer Museum, Los Angeles & Miami MOCA, Miami, the Drawing Center, New York. Steve Roden was also a recent recipient of the 2011 Artist Grant of the Foundation for Contemporary Arts, and recently of a California Community Foundation Getty Fellowship Grant.

References

External links
 Official website
 Steve Roden at Discogs
 Steve Roden and Stephen Vitiello in Bomb

Living people
American electronic musicians
Artists from Los Angeles
Performance art in Los Angeles
Musicians from Los Angeles
Year of birth missing (living people)